Gilbert T. Gray (June 1, 1902 – July 27, 1981) was an American sailor who competed in the 1932 Summer Olympics.

In 1932 he was a crew member of the American boat Jupiter which won the gold medal in the Star class.

External links 
 
 
 
 

1902 births
1981 deaths
American male sailors (sport)
Olympic gold medalists for the United States in sailing
Sailors at the 1932 Summer Olympics – Star
Southern Yacht Club
Medalists at the 1932 Summer Olympics
Star class world champions
World champions in sailing for the United States